Couch surfing or sofa surfing is the practice of moving from one friend or relative's house to another, sleeping in whatever spare space is available, floor or couch, and generally staying a few days before moving on to the next house. People sometimes couch-surf when travelling and sometimes because they are homeless.

Homelessness 
A dependence on couch surfing is a form of homelessness. Couch surfing is usually missed by homeless counts and is therefore a type of hidden homelessness. For example, in 2017, HUD counted 114 thousand children as homeless in the United States in their homeless count, while surveys conducted by the Department of Education concluded there were 1.3 million. Couch surfing is especially common among those under the age of 25, including children. In Britain, 1 in 5 young people have couch surfed at least once each year, and almost half of those have done so for more than a month.

While safer than sleeping in the rough, couch surfing is not an adequate long term housing solution. Most couch surfers only stay in a single home for a short period of time. This may be because their host limits their stay, they voluntarily leave to preserve friendships, or they are forced to leave the home of a person who is abusive or has a drug problem. Some couch surfers have received housing in exchange for services such as cooking and cleaning. In other cases, people will have otherwise unwanted sexual encounters to be able to couch surf at a person's home for the night. Those who couch surf often sleep in the rough after leaving their accommodations.

See also
 CouchSurfing, a website designed to help arrange couch surfing
 Homestay, a popular form of hospitality and lodging whereby visitors share a residence with a local of the area to which they are traveling

References

Cultural exchange
Homelessness
Sharing economy
Sleep